La Loge is a commune in the Pas-de-Calais department in the Hauts-de-France region of France.

Geography
La Loge is situated some 12 miles (19 km) southeast of Montreuil-sur-Mer on the D108 road and at the edge of the forest of Hesdin.

History
La Loge was created as the hunting lodge for the Dukes of Burgundy and the Counts of Artois.
In 1944–45, the village was bombed by the Allies, destroying the German V1 launch-pads.

Population

Places of interest
 The seventeenth century church of the Nativité-de-Notre-Dame.
 A chapel dating from the seventeenth century.

See also
Communes of the Pas-de-Calais department

References

Loge
Artois